Sophie Watts (born 1985) is a British-born entrepreneur, investor and media executive. She is the founding President of the global movie and TV studio STX Entertainment, a co-founder of the global web3 agency Metacurio and a serial investor and global entrepreneur. Watts is notable for being the only female media executive in history to have built a Hollywood film studio from the ground up, which was valued at over US $2.5 billion at her departure.

Personal life

Watts was born in London, England, the daughter of music video and music film producer Tessa Watts - one of the pioneers of the music video industry at Virgin Records - and rock journalist and newspaper editor Michael Watts. She has publicly protested the publication of her relationship to the prominent Whitney family, of which she is a direct heir, including to The New York Times, citing misrepresentation and security issues. She grew up in London and Bedfordshire and attended Gonville and Caius College at the University of Cambridge. She graduated with First-Class Honours (summa cum laude) in History (Master's), and was awarded recognition as a Senior Scholar of her college, where she wrote an economic history thesis on the rise of business in Asia.

Early career

Early in her career, Watts worked in music film, videos and programming with artists including Sir Paul McCartney, Sir Elton John, U2, Beyoncé, Madonna, and Mariah Carey. She has estimated to have worked on over 100 live shows. She moved to Los Angeles in 2007, where she was a producer and financier on film projects including the documentary Bully. The film was awarded the Producers Guild of America (PGA) Stanley Kramer award in 2013, honoring productions and individuals that “illuminate and raise public awareness of important social issues.” By 2014, the film had been viewed by over 3.5 million secondary students across the United States.

STX Entertainment

Origins

In 2011, Watts started working with Robert "Bob" Simonds to build a next-generation film and television studio that would “make, market and distribute star-driven, commercial" content. Incubated with capital from private equity firm TPG Growth, the company grew to secure capital from investors including private equity company Hony Capital, Chinese streaming giant Tencent, the Hong Kong communications and technology company PCCW, and the world's largest international cable company Liberty Global. In 2014, STX announced that it had secured over $1 billion in financing. During Watts's tenure, STX Entertainment grew from inception into a media conglomerate which, based on preliminary paperwork for its planned initial public offering, valued the company at over US$2.5 billion.

STXfilms
In 2014, Simonds and Watts hired a series of film executives under the Corporate team, including former Universal Pictures Chairman Adam Fogelson. The studio announced that it would make at least 10 “commercial” movies a year and that it would function as a next-generation, fully integrated film studio. The studio also signed a multiyear television output agreement to release its films exclusively to Showtime Networks, and entered into a multiyear partnership with Universal Studios Home Entertainment. 

While Watts was at STX, the studio's projects included Bad Moms, Golden Globe nominee Molly's Game, Jackie Chan-starrer The Foreigner, and The Gift. In 2016, STXfilms became the fastest studio that year to hit $100-million at the domestic box office with Bad Moms, earned a People's Choice award winner for best comedy for the film, garnered a Golden Globe nomination for Hailee Steinfeld in The Edge of Seventeen, and procured DGA Best New Director nominations for multiple films. Under Watts, the studio worked with talent including Julia Roberts, Mila Kunis, Amy Schumer, Vin Diesel, Charlize Theron, Gerald Butler, Guy Ritchie, Mark Wahlberg, Jessica Chastain, Will Smith, and Jennifer Lopez. To date, STX has produced, marketed and distributed over 75 movies.

STXtv

In 2014, Watts oversaw the launch of STXtv, the studio's TV division. She is credited as an Executive Producer on STX's NBC Primetime television show State of Affairs, starring Katherine Heigl, which debuted to a rating of 2.2 in the key demo with an average 8.6 million viewers.  Other shows under the division include HBO’s smash-hit FBoy Island, the Nat Geo show Valley of the Boom, and Number One Surprise, the first ever television show created by a US-based company specifically for broadcast in China and which quickly became the #1 show in China with over one billion total views.

Resignation from STX
In January 2018, Watts resigned from her role as Corporate President at STX Entertainment, citing a desire to focus on aggressive new media business models. STX Co-Founder Robert Simonds praised Watts as "a force of nature...[an] incredibly talented, versatile executive who has been central to every aspect of growing the company, both domestically and internationally, from inception to the multi-billion-dollar endeavor it is today.".

Talent Ventures 
Following her departure from STX, Watts continued to advise the studio while also speaking globally about the entrepreneurial value of celebrity-partnered ventures that are “powered by but not constricted to” premium content. She has subsequently built multiple talent-driven companies, including a globally-successful sports ecosystem with Mike Tyson that combined a live sports show with music entertainment, a premium docuseries, and owned-and-controlled consumer products. Watts produced the live event itself, which included a fight between Mike Tyson and Roy Jones Jr. (billed as Mike Tyson vs. Roy Jones Jr.), at the Staples Center in November 2020, and which became the highest selling PPV event of the year and ranks in the Top-10 for PPV purchased events of all-time. In 2020, Watts was widely recognized by publications including USA Today as being “one of the two powerhouse women” responsible for Tyson's return to the ring.

Investments 
Watts has advised, consulted on corporate strategy, and led capital fundraising efforts for multiple media and media-related ventures, including the virtual product placement company Ryff, the streaming platform Mansa, and the web3 creative agency Metacurio, which has over 70 globally-recognized clients. Her holdings are maintained under SW Companies (SWC), of which she is Founder and CEO. A prolific investor and serial entrepreneur, Watts has over a dozen portfolio companies under SWC.

Accolades

Watts has been listed as one of Hollywood's top dealmakers in Variety magazine's "Dealmakers Impact Report" for her work at STX, and as one of Fortune's 40 under 40, the magazine's annual ranking of the most influential people in business as chosen by "power, influence and success." She was featured on the Women's Impact Report in 2015, 2016 and 2017 (Variety magazine's annual list of women who make a significant impact on the entertainment industry), the National Diversity Council's 2016 list of the "Top 50 Most Powerful Women in Entertainment," and The Hollywood Reporter'''s Women in Entertainment Power 100, the outlet's annual roster of the most influential women in entertainment. Elle'' magazine's November 2016 edition named Watts one of Hollywood's "next-to-know...heavy hitters." Watts has also been listed on the Variety500, an "index of the 500 most influential business leaders shaping the global $2 trillion entertainment industry."

Boards

Watts is currently on the Board of Directors for Ryff, a virtual product placement company, the web3 creative studio Metacurio, and BritWeek. She was formerly on the Board of Directors of BAFTA LA and the American non-profit organization The Trevor Project, which is focused on suicide prevention efforts for the LGBTQ community.

References

Living people
British media executives
Alumni of Gonville and Caius College, Cambridge
STX Entertainment
1985 births